Donald Eugene Herndon (June 4, 1936 – January 10, 2009) was a professional American football halfback. He played with the New York Titans of the American Football League during the 1960 AFL season.

References

1936 births
2009 deaths
People from Wauchula, Florida
Players of American football from Florida
American football halfbacks
New York Titans (AFL) players
Hardee High School alumni